Chak No 98 ML is a village of Layyah District and Tehsil Karor Lal Eson that is situated on Karor-Fateh Pur road, 12.5 km far from Karor toward east. Chak has union Council namely “Union Council Chak No 98 ML.The  village has famous tomb of Baba Gafoor Shah.  Govt High School for Boys is famous due to its good result in the area which is administrating by Ali Ashghar (Senior Headmaster). Village also has Govt Girls High School. Wheat, Cotton, Millet, Mungbean are the main crops cultivating in the cultivated areas. Some farmers also planted citrus orchards. Cultivated land is being irrigated by Maharan Canal which is in the west side of the village.
 People of the village are educated and GOVT servant. 98 M.L is a very peaceful Chak in the district.
 Famous festivals of chak include annual Mela Baba Ghafoor Shah at tomb of Hazrat Baba Ghafoor Shah, annual Mela of Hazrat Baba Buland Shah at daira Haji Sher Muhammad Late . Chak 98 is a centre for different Processions of Eid Milad Un Nabi S.A.W that gather at Jamia Masjid 98Ml. Hazrat Allama Molana Muhammad Bukhsh Hasni Late used to be the Head of all these processions.
 Chak also has a dispensary. 
 Chak 98 has big masjid named ('''jamiya masjid madina)  
 This Chak is at the centre of Fatehpur city & Kror city 13KM wide from Fatehpur and Kror in the chakv

Villages in Layyah District